Sacred Heart Cathedral, Bendigo, is the cathedral church of the Roman Catholic Diocese of Sandhurst and seat of the Bishop of Sandhurst. The cathedral is located in the provincial city of Bendigo, Victoria, Australia. 
It was designed in the Gothic style in 1895 by an architect of the firm Reed, Barnes and Tappin.

Description
Sacred Heart Cathedral is one of Australia's largest churches and the third tallest after St Patrick's Cathedral and St Paul's Cathedral in Melbourne.  It is exceptionally large for a provincial city cathedral in Australia and its construction was made possible chiefly through the estate of Henry Backhaus (1811-1882), a German from Paderborn and the first Catholic priest on the Bendigo goldfields. Backhaus was very skilled in financial matters and accumulated considerable property - not least through encouraging his gold-mining parishioners to contribute some of their finds to the work of the church. Backhaus left his wealth for the benefit of the church and enabled the cathedral, among other things, to be built.

In 1895, Martin Crane, an Augustinian and the first bishop of the diocese, called for competitive designs for a cathedral from several architects. The winning architect was William Tappin of the firm Reed, Barnes and Tappin, a firm established by Joseph Reed, one of Melbourne's most significant architects. It was built in the Gothic Revival style from sandstone quarried from the Geelong area.

The large pipe organ, built by Bishop & Son of London, was installed late in 1905.

After a long interval, work recommenced on the cathedral in 1954 and was completed in 1977. The later works were designed by Bates, Smart and McCutcheon, the successor of Reed, Barnes and Tappin. The spire was of lighter construction than that originally designed, being steel framed and clad with a masonry veneer.

Sacred Heart Cathedral is 75 metres long and has a ceiling height of 24 metres. The main spire is 87 metres high.

Photo gallery

References

External links

Official website
Diocese of Sandhurst website

Roman Catholic cathedrals in Victoria (Australia)
Bendigo
Buildings and structures in Bendigo
Sandstone churches in Australia
Gothic Revival church buildings in Australia
Roman Catholic Diocese of Sandhurst
Roman Catholic churches completed in 1901
Bendigo
Bendigo